Kondratovo is a rural locality (a village) and the administrative center of Kondratovskoye Rural Settlement, Permsky District, Perm Krai, Russia. The population was 10,023 as of 2010. There are 90 streets.

Geography 
Kondratovo is located 12 km southwest of Perm (the district's administrative centre) by road. Ust-Mully is the nearest rural locality.

References 

Rural localities in Permsky District